Scirpophaga kumatai is a moth in the family Crambidae. It was described by Angoon Lewvanich in 1981. It is found in Nepal.

References

Moths described in 1981
Schoenobiinae
Moths of Asia